The Cabinet of Benin is appointed by the President of the Republic and is subject to the opinion of the Bureau of the National Assembly.

Current formation 
The current government of Benin, in place since May 25, 2021, is made up of 24 ministers:

 Minister of State in charge of Planning and Development: Abdoulaye Bio Tchané
 Minister of Justice and Legislation: Sévérin Quenum
 Minister of Foreign Affairs and Cooperation: Aurélien Agbénonci
 Minister of Economy and Finance: Romuald Wadagni
 Minister of the Interior and Public Security: Sacca Lafia
 Minister of the Living Environment and Sustainable Development: José Didier Tonato
 Minister of Agriculture, Livestock and Fisheries: Gaston Dossouhoui
 Minister of Decentralization and Local Governance: Alassane Seidou
 Minister of Labour and Public Service: Adidjatou Mathys
 Minister of Social Affairs and Micro-Finance: Véronique Tognifodé Mewanou
 Minister of Health: Benjamin Hounkpatin
 Minister of Higher Education and Scientific Research: Éléonore Yayi Ladekan
 Minister of Secondary, Technical and Vocational Education: Mahougnon Kakpo
 Minister of Nursery and Primary Education: Karimou Salimane
 Minister of Tourism, Culture and the Arts: Babalola Jean-Michel Hervé Abimbola
 Minister of Digital and Digitization: Aurélie Adam Soule
 Minister of Infrastructure and Transport: Hervé Yves Hehomey
 Minister of Industry and Trade: Shadiya Alimatou Assouman
 Minister of Energy: Dona Jean-Claude Houssou
 Minister of Water and Mines: Samou Seïdou Adambi
 Minister of Small and Medium Enterprises and Employment Promotion: Modeste Kerekou
 Minister of Sports: Oswald Homeky
 Minister of Communication and Post: Alain Sourou Orounla
 Minister of National Defence: Fortunet Alain Nouatin

References 

Politics of Benin